was a Japanese novelist and scholar of Chinese literature in Shōwa period Japan. His wife was fellow writer Takako Takahashi.

Biography
Takahashi was born in Naniwa-ku, Osaka, and was a graduate of Kyoto University. While still a student, he contributed to the Gendai Bungaku literary magazine. He was encouraged to study the Chinese language and Chinese history by fellow writer Eiji Yoshikawa. He became a professor at Ritsumeikan University in Kyoto in 1959. During the widespread violent student protest movements in the 1960s against the Treaty of Mutual Cooperation and Security between the United States and Japan, Takahashi was an outspoken supporter of the radical student movement. He moved to Meiji University briefly in 1966 before returning to Kyoto University in 1967.

His novel, Hi no utsuwa (“Vessel of Sorrow”, 1962), depicts the fall of a university dean from respectability due to his self-centered love affairs. Other works include Yuutsu naru Toha (“A Melancholy Faction”, 1965) and Jashumon (“Heretical Faith”, 1965–66).

Takahashi died of colon cancer at the young age of 39. His grave is at the Fuji Reien Cemetery in Shizuoka Prefecture.

References
Miller, Scott J. The A to Z of Modern Japanese Literature and Theater. Rowman & Littlefield (2010) 
 Takahashi, Takako. Takahashi Kazumi to iu hito: Nijugonen no nochi ni. Kawade Shobo Shinsha (1997).  (Japanese)

1931 births
1971 deaths
People from Osaka
Japanese essayists
Academic staff of Kyoto University
Kyoto University alumni
Deaths from colorectal cancer
Deaths from cancer in Japan
20th-century Japanese novelists
20th-century essayists